Kadhal FM is a 2005 Tamil film directed by Jayaprakash starring Manikandan, Shivani Singh and Aravind Akash. The movie was shot in and around Pondicherry, Tuticorin, Karaikudi and Tiruchi.

Cast
Manikandan as Manikandan
Shivani Singh as Ruchika
Aravind Akash as Aravind
Karunas as Chilly Chicken
Ilavarasu as Astrologer
Vaiyapuri as Inspector
Lollu Sabha Balaji
Ajay Rathnam
Anu Mohan as Traffic police
Balu Anand

Production
The film is directed by V. Jayaprakash who previously directed Sathisanam (1997).

Soundtrack
Soundtrack was composed by Aravind-Shankar.
Adam Eval - Karthik
Bhagyasaali - Timmy
Kadale - Srinivas
Mugama - Chinmayi
Un udal - Sandeep, Sunitha Sarathy

Reception
Indiaglitz wrote "The narration could have been taut and a bit more urgency could have brought into the proceedings. But Jayaprakash has shown some promise. But the room for improvement is still there.". BBthots called it "uninteresting, uninvolving, vulgar film". Malini Mannath of Chennai Online opined that "But otherwise, there's not much going for the film with its hotch-potch situations and lacklustre narration. A couple of suggestive lines have been surreptitiously pushed in, and the sound picturisations too border more on the 'sizzling' than the aesthetic".

References

2005 films
2000s Tamil-language films
Films shot in Tiruchirappalli
Films shot in Puducherry